Zenteno is a Spanish surname. Notable people with the surname include:

Edward Zenteno (born 1984), Bolivian footballer
José Ignacio Zenteno (1786–1847), Chilean soldier and politician
Mauricio Zenteno (born 1984), Chilean footballer

Spanish-language surnames